Shark minnow (Luciosoma bleekeri; , , , ,  or) is a species of small cyprinid fish found in Southeast Asia from the Mae Klong River to the Mekong. It lives mainly in rivers, moving into flooded forests and fields during the floods and back into the river as the floods recede. It usually swims close to the surface in schools of many individuals. It is one of the most abundant of the different types of minnow-sized fishes known as pla sio in Thailand.

Uses

This small fish is important in the cuisine of Thailand, Laos, Cambodia and Vietnam where it is seasonally found in great numbers. It is commonly deep-fried, pickled or fermented as pla ra, padaek and prahok, as well as salted and dried. It is eaten also raw in Lao and Isan cuisine.

See also
Cambodian cuisine
Lao cuisine
List of Thai ingredients

References

Luciosoma
Fish of Thailand
Fish described in 1878